Raminder Singh Ranger, Baron Ranger,  (born July 1947) is a British businessman, and the founder of Sun Mark and Sea Air & Land  Forwarding, an international marketing and distribution company. He is also chairman and managing director of Sea Air and Land Forwarding Ltd.

He was nominated for a life peerage and a seat in the House of Lords in Theresa May's resignation honours. He was created Baron Ranger, of Mayfair in the City of Westminster, on 11 October 2019.

Early life and education
Ranger was born in May 1947 in Gujranwala, now in Pakistan. He has seven brothers and a sister. Since the family had migrated to Patiala in the Punjab state of India during India's partition, Ranger was given admission to the Modern Senior Secondary School in Patiala. After the completion of his school education, he went to Mohindra College, and then obtained a BA degree from the Government College in Chandigarh. Ranger ceased his studies after reaching the UK where he had gone to study Law in May 1971.

Career
Ranger is the Chairman of Sun Mark Ltd and Sea Air & Land Forwarding Ltd. He was awarded an honorary doctorate from the University of West London in July 2016.

An employment tribunal ruled in 2021 that Ranger harassed a woman who complained about sexual harassment in his company.

Honours
He was appointed a Member of the Order of the British Empire in the 2005 Birthday Honours for services to business and the Asian community, and made a Commander of the Order of the British Empire (CBE) in the 2016 New Year Honours for services to business and community cohesion.

Social and political work
As of January 2018, Ranger, through Sun Mark, had donated more than £1 million to the Conservative Party, and £25,000 to Theresa May's party leadership campaign.

Ranger was appointed the joint chairman of Conservative Friends of India in 2018, sharing the role with then-MP Zac Goldsmith. The group, which is affiliated to the Conservative Party, aims to build stronger links between the party, the British Indian community and India.

Hindu Forum of Britain
A representative of Nithyananda attended a Diwali event held in October 2022 at the Houses of Parliament as a guest of the Hindu Forum of Britain. Nithya Atmadayananda, a prominent supporter of Nithyananda, was photographed with Bob Blackman and President of the Hindu Forum of Britain, Trupti Patel. The event was attended by Rami Ranger. The brochure for the event featured a full-page advert for Kailasa UK containing images of Nithyananda. Ranger told The Observer he had no knowledge of Nithyananda or his organisation stating: "I do not know Kailaasa or this person."

Attacks on Journalists 
Ranger was reported in December 2022 to be under investigation by authorities at the House of Lords in regard to the alleged harassment of journalist Poonam Joshi who reported on Ranger's attendance at a Diwali event in the Houses of Parliament also attended by a representative of fugitive Cult-leader Nithyananda. Ranger is alleged to have used Twitter and WhatsApp to send Joshi messages that threatened her.

In January 2023 it was reported that Ranger had sent a letter to BBC Director General Tim Davie regarding the documentary "India: The Modi Question" in which he allegedly asked "if your Pakistani-origin staff were behind this nonsense".

Personal life
His daughter, Reena Ranger, is also a Conservative politician.

References

External links
 Twitter page

1948 births
Living people
British businesspeople of Indian descent
Indian emigrants to England
Conservative Party (UK) donors
Conservative Party (UK) life peers
British company founders
Life peers created by Elizabeth II
People from Gujranwala
Naturalised citizens of the United Kingdom
British politicians of Indian descent